Dragan Velikić (born 7 July 1953) is a Serbian novelist, short story writer, essayist and former Ambassador to Austria. He's one of the best known writers of modern Serbia. His influences include Gaito Gazdanov, Mikhail Bulgakov, Constantine P. Cavafy, Ivo Andrić and Aleksandar Tišma among other authors. Velkić's best known works are the novels Ruski prozor and Islednik, for both of which he won the NIN award.

Works

Novels
 Via Pula (1988)
 Astragan (1991)
 Hamsin 51 (1993)
 Severni zid (1995)
 Danteov trg (1997)
 Slučaj Bremen (2001)
 Dosije Domaševski (2003)
 Ruski prozor (2007), NIN award
 Bonavia (2012)
 Islednik (2015), NIN award
 Adresa (2019)

Short stories
 Pogrešan pokret (1983)
 Staklena bašta (1985)
 Beograd i druge priče (2009)

Essays
 Yu-Atlantida (1993)
 Deponija (1994)
 Stanje stvari (1998)
 Pseća pošta (2006)
 O piscima i gradovima (2010)

References 

1953 births
Serbian writers
Serbian politicians
University of Belgrade Faculty of Philology alumni
Living people